Odebolt–Arthur–Battle Creek–Ida Grove Community School District (OABCIG) is a rural public school district headquartered in Ida Grove, Iowa.

The consolidated district has territory in Crawford, Ida, Sac and Woodbury counties. Communities served include Ida Grove, Arthur, Battle Creek and Odebolt.

History
The former Odebolt–Arthur Community School District and the Battle Creek–Ida Grove Community School District, in 2009, started a "grade sharing" in which the districts sent their children to the same high school and shared personnel. There was a previous attempt to merge the districts in fall 2016, but voters from Odebolt–Arthur voted it down out of fear that their school would close. There were tensions between the Odebolt–Arthur and Battle Creek–Ida Grove communities. By 2018 the merger was approved.

Schools
 OABCIG High School (Ida Grove)
 OABCIG Middle School (Odebolt)
 OABCIG Elementary Odebolt (Odebolt)
 OABCIG Elementary Ida Grove (Ida Grove)

OABCIG High School

Athletics
The Falcons compete in the Western Valley Activities Conference in the following sports:
Cross Country
Volleyball
Football
 2019 Class 2A State Champions
Basketball
 Girls' 2011 Class 2A State Champions 
Wrestling
Track and Field
Golf
Baseball
Softball

See also
List of school districts in Iowa
List of high schools in Iowa

References

External links
 Odebolt-Arthur-Battle Creek-Ida Grove Community School District (formerly as OA & BCIG Community School Districts)

School districts in Iowa
2018 establishments in Iowa
School districts established in 2018
Education in Crawford County, Iowa
Education in Ida County, Iowa
Education in Sac County, Iowa
Education in Woodbury County, Iowa